Mvuba is a Central Sudanic language of northeastern Congo, with a thousand speakers in Uganda. It is similar to Lese.

References

Central Sudanic languages